Peduru Hewage Lionel Premasiri is a Sri Lankan politician. He was a former representative of Galle District in the Parliament of Sri Lanka.

He studied at Mahinda College, Galle. He became a lawyer and then entered the politics from Sri Lanka Freedom Party and became the mayor of Galle. Later due to some discrepancies, he joined the United National Party and then became the mayor of Galle again. He became a member of Parliament in 2004 from United National Party. He was one of the first UNP politicians to join the Government of United People's Freedom Alliance. He was the deputy minister of Social Services and Social Welfare in the previous UPFA government.

References

1962 births
Living people
Mayors of Galle
Members of the 13th Parliament of Sri Lanka
United National Party politicians
United People's Freedom Alliance politicians
Alumni of Mahinda College
People from Galle